Marion railway station is located on the Seaford line. Situated in the south-western Adelaide suburb of Marion, it is 11.4 kilometres from Adelaide station.

History
Until the early 1950s the Ascot Park and Oaklands stations serviced Marion with a single rail track. In 1953 the line was duplicated as far as Oaklands, and as part of that work a new station was constructed at Marion. It was opened on 26 May 1954. Marion received a station building similar to that still remaining at Woodlands Park station.

In the 1960s concerns were raised regarding the safety of pedestrians crossing at the southern end of the station, where no pedestrian barriers had been installed. This lack was seen as contributing to a fatality in 1967. In response, a pedestrian footbridge was constructed in 1970, and the then existing pedestrian maze barrier-equipped crossing at the northern end was removed. This ensured that the footbridge provided the sole personal access to both the platform and to the other side of the line. At the northern end, a more convenient low-level track crossing and station access was re-installed in the 1990s.

Rebuild 
As part of the electrification of the line, Marion station was rebuilt in 2013, with a new waiting shelter installed, an underpass built and the bridge demolished. The underpass was built at the northern end to replace the overpass and pedestrian crossing. The project was completed on 30 November 2013. Local residents had expressed their preference that the overpass be replaced instead, based largely on undesirable behaviour that occurs in an underpass because of the lack of visibility. Although it was meant to address flooding issues that had plagued the area, the underpass flooded twice in 2014.

Platform Length 
In 2017, it was addressed that the station can not facilitate trains longer than five cars in length. This is a problem on AFL game days when trains of six carriages must overhang the platform. DPTI have not acted further on the issue and the platform is unlikely to be extended in the near future however it would be preferable for the better function of this station. As of the upgrades to the station in 2014, the platform was slightly shortened due to the new underpass being constructed at the North end of the station where a ground level pedestrian crossing formerly sat.

Services by platform

See also 
 Railways in Adelaide
 Rail transport in South Australia

References

External links

Railway stations in Adelaide
Railway stations in Australia opened in 1954